DIY Rescue is a home renovation television series which screened on the Nine Network in 2003. It was loosely based on the British television series DIY SOS.

DIY Rescue was hosted by Leah McLeod and featured Luke Van Dyk, Greg Norton, and Tara Dennis.

References

Australian non-fiction television series
Nine Network original programming
2003 Australian television series debuts
2003 Australian television series endings